Lord Rochester may refer to:

 Earl of Rochester
 Henry Wilmot, 1st Earl of Rochester (1612–1658), English soldier
 John Wilmot, 2nd Earl of Rochester (1647–1680), English poet and courtier
 Laurence Hyde, 1st Earl of Rochester (1642–1711), English statesman, uncle of Queen Anne
 Henry Hyde, 4th Earl of Clarendon, 2nd Earl of Rochester (1672–1753), English politician
 Viscount Rochester
 Baron Rochester